Preveza is one of the regional units of Greece. It is part of the Epirus region. Its capital is the town of Preveza.

Geography

The regional unit of Preveza is located northwest of the Ambracian Gulf. The Ionian Sea lies to the west. The terrain is mostly hilly. The mountains of Xerovouni are in the far northeast. Rivers include the Louros in the east, and Acheron in the north.

Its climate is typically Mediterranean with hot dry summers and cool winters. Snow is not uncommon in winter at higher elevations.

Administration

The regional unit Preveza is subdivided into 3 municipalities. These are (number as in the map in the infobox):
Parga (3)
Preveza (1)
Ziros (2)

Prefecture

Preveza was established as a prefecture in 1915. As a part of the 2011 Kallikratis government reform, the regional unit Preveza was created out of the former prefecture Preveza. The prefecture had the same territory as the present regional unit. At the same time, the municipalities were reorganised, according to the table below.

History

The area was first settled by the Greek tribe of the Thesprotians and subsequently formed part of the Kingdom of Epirus and later the Roman Empire. The Battle of Actium took place in the area in 31 BC, following which the city of Nicopolis ("city of victory") was built by Augustus.  The area became part of the Byzantine Empire, and following the Fourth Crusade, split off along with the rest of Epirus to form the Despotate of Epirus. The area passed to Ottoman rule in the 14th century, which lasted until 1913.  Following the Balkan Wars, the area was awarded to Greece in 1913, at which point the prefecture was created. The prefecture included the island of Lefkada, until the latter was split off in 1955 as a separate prefecture Lefkada.

Sights
The ruins of the ancient cities of Nicopolis and Cassope, and the Necromanteion lie in the prefecture. Zalongo is a mountain village, known for its monastery. Parga is a historic port town and a resort.

Transport

The Aktio-Preveza Undersea Tunnel, which runs underneath the Ambracian Gulf, connects Preveza with Aetolia-Acarnania to the south.

Greek National Road 5/E55, E, NE
Greek National Road 18, S, SW, W, NW
Greek National Road 21, S, SE, E

Persons

Kostas Karyotakis (October 30, 1896 in Tripoli – July 20, 1928)

See also
 List of settlements in the Preveza regional unit

References

External links
Preveza Weather Station SV6GMQ - Live Weather Conditions (in English and Greek)

 
Prefectures of Greece
1915 establishments in Greece
Regional units in Epirus (region)